The Nepryadva is a right tributary of the Don river in Tula Oblast, Russia. 
The river is 67 km long and its catchment area comprises 799 square kilometers. 

Near the mouth of the river the Battle of Kulikovo was fought in the late summer of 1380.

References

See also 
 2869 Nepryadva

Rivers of Tula Oblast